Corylophomyces is a genus of fungi in the family Laboulbeniaceae. The genus contain 5 species.

References

External links
Corylophomyces at Index Fungorum

Laboulbeniaceae
Laboulbeniales genera